Gangshan District (Hakka: Kông-sân-khî), is a suburban district in Kaohsiung City in southern Taiwan. It has 95,557 inhabitants in February 2023. The township is part of the suburbs of Kaohsiung City which encompass 10 cities (or townships) out of 18 in the official Kaohsiung Metro Area.

History and Names
In 1920, during the Japanese era, the town of A-kong-tien (阿公店) was renamed  and made the site of an airbase. Administratively Okayama Town covered modern day Gangshan District and Ciaotou District and was under Okayama District, Takao Prefecture. The town suffered heavy bombardment in World War II.

Following the Surrender of Japan and handover to the Kuomintang, the government continued to use the same name (岡山), but transliterated using Mandarin (Gangshan). The town continued to host Gangshan Air Base (Kangshan Air Base), and has a strong military veteran's presence as well.

Administrative divisions
The district consists of Pingan, Gangshan, Shoutian, Weiren, Houhong, Daliao, Zhongxiao, Heping, Qianfeng, Liucuo, Xiehe, Houxie, Xinyi, Tande, Sanhe, Renshou, Bihong, Chengxiang, Zhuwei, Taishang, Wanli, Baimi, Shitan, Fuxing, Benzhou, Jiaxing, Jiafeng, Huagang, Dazhuang, Xierong, Weisui, Shoufeng and Renyi Village.

Politics
The district is part of Kaohsiung City Constituency II electoral district for Legislative Yuan.

Education
 Air Force Institute of Technology
 Republic of China Air Force Academy

Infrastructures
 Gangshan Refuse Incineration Plant

Tourist attractions
Gangshan District is known for restaurants serving goat meat, traditionally goats were raised in northern Kaohsiung because of the poor quality of the land. Due to this the area developed into a center of the regional trade, slaughter, and consumption of goats.
 Agongdian Reservoir
Gangshan Shoutian Temple
 Gangshan Water Tower
 Kaohsiung Museum of Shadow Puppet
 Republic of China Air Force Museum
 Siaogangshan Skywalk Park
 Soya-Mixed Meat Museum

Transportation

It is linked to Kaohsiung city center by the Gangshan South Station of MRT Red Line or TRA Gangshan Station.

Notable natives
 Lee Si-chen, engineer and researcher
 W. P. Andrew Lee, surgeon

See also
 Kaohsiung
 Agongdian River

References

External links

 
 Introduction to Gangshan

Districts of Kaohsiung